Pitambar Tarai (Born in 1959) is an Odisha Sahitya Academy awarded poet from Odisha, India. The prominent occupation in his family was commercial fishing. He was born in Mangarajpur village south of Kujang in the Jagatsinghpur district, Odisha. His poetry is mostly concerned with emotional topics of life, like sorrow and happiness. A common theme of his work is the mentioning of the Dalit, the lowest caste of Indian society.

Bibliography

Poetry Collection 
 Boonde Luhara peethire samudra – 1987
 Adi Parva – 1994
 Chita-chaitara chitha – 2002
 Raaga Rudrakshari – 2004
 Sairata Shatak
 Deha Dasabisha – 2007
 Itara – 2007
 Shudrakara Shloka – 2008
 Abhajana – 2010
 Pichhila tarikha o anyanya Kavita
 Sesha heba jain

Children's Literature 
 Luha Lahaka Patara Banka

Awards 
 Odisha Sahitya Academy Award(For Abhajana)
 Prajatantra Kavita Samman
 Chandrabhaga Kavita Samman
 Basant Muduli Kavita Samman
 Teer Tarang Kavita Samman
 Odisha Dalit Sahitya Academy Samman
 Dadhichi Samman

References 

1959 births
Living people
People from Jagatsinghpur district